List of rolling-stock leasing companies.

Australia
 CFCL Australia
 Consolidated Rail Leasing

Germany
 Railpool

Ireland
 NS Financial Services Company

Japan
 Mitsui Rail Capital

Luxembourg
 CBrail

Netherlands
 GE Capital Rail Services (Europe)

South Africa
 Sheltam

Sweden
 Transitio

Switzerland
 European Loc Pool

United Kingdom
 Angel Trains
 Beacon Rail
 Caledonian Rail Leasing
 Eversholt Rail Group
 GE Capital
 Halifax Asset Finance
 Macquarie European Rail
 Lombard North Central
 Porterbrook
 Rock Rail

United States
 Citirail
First Union Rail (formerly)
 GE Capital Rail Services (formerly)
 Marmon Holdings
 Union Tank Car Company
 Wells Fargo Rail

References

Rolling stock leasing companies